Tehran–Qom–Isfahan high-speed rail is the first truly high-speed rail project in Iran. Construction began on 25 February 2015. The rail line would decrease travel times between Tehran and Isfahan, passing through Qom. It connects Isfahan and Qom to Imam Khomeini International Airport.

The project is implemented by a Chinese consortium led by the China Railway Engineering Corporation. Completion is planned in 2021.

Concept
This line was the first high-speed railway proposed after the Islamic Revolution about 1990. The available technology allowed speeds of 270 km/h as in TGV in France and ICE in Germany.

After accepting the proposal for electrification of Tehran–Mashhad railway and increasing the target speed to 200 for locomotive-hauled trains and 250 for EMU, Tehran-Esfahan high-speed was studied for increasing the speed in 2006.

The available technology and standard at that time was suitable to go to 350 km/h. This was proposed to the road and transportation minister. The subject was referred to a consultant, and the geometry of track was studied again and was found acceptable for 350 for 70% of the Qom to Esfahan.

Stations
Tehran railway station
Imam Khomeini International Airport Terminal 2 and 3 Railway Station (planned)
Qom New railway station (planned)- Intersection with Arak–Qom High Speed Rail
Isfahan-North railway station (planned)

Project status

2016

2017

2018

2019

2020

2021

2022

2023

Rolling stock

High-speed trains

References

High-speed rail in Iran
Transport in Isfahan
Transportation in Isfahan Province
Transport in Qom
Transportation in Qom Province
Transport in Tehran
Transportation in Tehran Province
Rail transport in Iran

Proposed railway lines in Iran